Jón Halldórsson (November 2, 1889 – July 7, 1984) was an athlete from Iceland who competed in the 1912 Summer Olympics.

References

Jon Holldorsson
Athletes (track and field) at the 1912 Summer Olympics
Jon Holldorsson
1889 births
1984 deaths